The Arrondissement of Charleroi is one of the seven administrative arrondissements in the Walloon province of Hainaut, Belgium. It is both an administrative and a judicial arrondissement. However, the Judicial Arrondissement of Charleroi also comprises the municipalities of the Arrondissement of Thuin.

Municipalities
The Administrative Arrondissement of Charleroi consists of the following municipalities:

Since 2019 

Aiseau-Presles
Chapelle-lez-Herlaimont
Charleroi
Châtelet
Courcelles
Farciennes

Fleurus
Fontaine-l'Evêque
Gerpinnes
Les Bons Villers
Montigny-le-Tilleul
Pont-à-Celles

Before 2019 

Aiseau-Presles
Chapelle-lez-Herlaimont
Charleroi
Châtelet
Courcelles
Farciennes
Fleurus

Fontaine-l'Evêque
Gerpinnes
Les Bons Villers
Manage
Montigny-le-Tilleul
Pont-à-Celles
Seneffe

The municipalities of Manage and Seneffe are transferred on January 1, 2019 to the Arrondissement of Soignies.

References 

Charleroi